The following is a list of symbols of the Indian state of Uttarakhand.

Official state symbols

Unofficial state symbols

See also
National symbols of India
List of Indian state symbols

References

State symbols
State symbols
Uttarakhand